Trnovec may refer to: 

In Croatia:
Trnovec Bartolovečki, a municipality
Trnovec, Međimurje County

In Slovakia:
Trnovec, Slovakia
Trnovec nad Váhom

In Slovenia:
Trnovec, Kočevje, a settlement in the Municipality of Kočevje, southern Slovenia
Trnovec, Medvode, a settlement in the Municipality of Medvode, central Slovenia
Trnovec, Metlika, a settlement in the Municipality of Metlika, southeastern Slovenia
Trnovec pri Dramljah, a settlement in the Municipality of Šentjur, eastern Slovenia
Trnovec pri Slovenski Bistrici, a settlement in the Municipality of Slovenski Bistrici, northeastern Slovenia
Trnovec, Rečica ob Savinji, a settlement in the Municipality of Rečica ob Savinji, northeastern Slovenia
Trnovec, Sevnica, a settlement in the Municipality of Sevnica, central Slovenia
Trnovec, Videm, a settlement in the Municipality of Videm, northeastern Slovenia